A standard illuminant is a theoretical source of visible light with a spectral power distribution that is published. Standard illuminants provide a basis for comparing images or colors recorded under different lighting.

CIE illuminants
The International Commission on Illumination (usually abbreviated CIE for its French name) is the body responsible for publishing all of the well-known standard illuminants. Each of these is known by a letter or by a letter-number combination.

Illuminants A, B, and C were introduced in 1931, with the intention of respectively representing average incandescent light, direct sunlight, and average daylight. Illuminants D represent variations of daylight, illuminant E is the equal-energy illuminant, while illuminants F represent fluorescent lamps of various composition.

There are instructions on how to experimentally produce light sources ("standard sources") corresponding to the older illuminants. For the relatively newer ones (such as series D), experimenters are left to measure to profiles of their sources and compare them to the published spectra:

Nevertheless, they do provide a measure, called the metamerism index, to assess the quality of daylight simulators. The Metamerism Index tests how well five sets of metameric samples match under the test and reference illuminant. In a manner similar to the color rendering index, the average difference between the metamers is calculated.

Illuminant A
The CIE defines illuminant A in these terms:

The spectral radiant exitance of a black body follows Planck's law:

In 1968, the estimate of c2 was revised from 0.01438 m·K to 0.014388 m·K (and before that, it was 0.01435 m·K when illuminant A was standardized). This difference shifted the Planckian locus, changing the color temperature of the illuminant from its nominal 2848 K to 2856 K:

In order to avoid further possible changes in the color temperature, the CIE now specifies the SPD directly, based on the original (1931) value of c2:

Illuminants B and C
Illuminants B and C are easily achieved daylight simulations. They modify illuminant A by using liquid filters. B served as a representative of noon sunlight, with a correlated color temperature (CCT) of 4874 K, while C represented average day light with a CCT of 6774 K. Unfortunately, they are poor approximations of any phase of natural daylight, particularly in the short-wave visible and in the ultraviolet spectral ranges. Once more realistic simulations were achievable, illuminants B and C were deprecated in favor of the D series:.
 Illuminant B was not so honored in 2004.

The liquid filters, designed by Raymond Davis, Jr. and Kasson S. Gibson in 1931, have a relatively high absorbance at the red end of the spectrum, effectively increasing the CCT of the incandescent lamp to daylight levels. This is similar in function to a CTO color gel that photographers and cinematographers use today, albeit much less convenient.

Each filter uses a pair of solutions, comprising specific amounts of distilled water, copper sulfate, mannite, pyridine, sulfuric acid, cobalt, and ammonium sulfate. The solutions are separated by a sheet of uncolored glass. The amounts of the ingredients are carefully chosen so that their combination yields a color temperature conversion filter; that is, the filtered light is still white.

Illuminant series D

Derived by Judd, MacAdam, and Wyszecki, the D series of illuminants are constructed to represent natural daylight. They are difficult to produce artificially, but are easy to characterize mathematically.

Judd et al. analyzed these samples and found that the (x, y) chromaticity coordinates had a simple, quadratic relation:

Simonds supervised the characteristic vector analysis of the SPDs. Application of his method revealed that the SPDs could be satisfactorily approximated by using the mean (S0) and first two characteristic vectors (S1 and S2):

In simpler terms, the SPD of the studied daylight samples can be expressed as the linear combination of three, fixed SPDs. The first vector (S0) is the mean of all the SPD samples, which is the best reconstituted SPD that can be formed with only a fixed vector. The second vector (S1) corresponds to yellow–blue variation, accounting for changes in the correlated color temperature due to presence or absence of clouds or direct sunlight. The third vector (S2) corresponds to pink–green variation caused by the presence of water in the form of vapor and haze.

To construct a daylight simulator of a particular correlated color temperature one merely needs to know the coefficients M1 and M2 of the characteristic vectors S1 and S2.

Expressing the chromaticities x and y as:

and making use of known tristimulus values for the mean vectors, they were able to express M1 and M2 as follows:

The only problem is that this left unsolved the computation of the coordinate  for a particular phase of daylight. Judd et al. simply tabulated the values of certain chromaticity coordinates, corresponding to commonly used correlated color temperatures, such as 5500 K, 6500 K, and 7500 K. For other color temperatures, one could consult figures made by Kelly. This problem was addressed in the CIE report that formalized illuminant D, with an approximation of the x coordinate in terms of the reciprocal color temperature, valid from 4000 K to 25000 K. The y coordinate trivially followed from Judd's quadratic relation.

Judd et al. then extended the reconstituted SPDs to – and – by using Moon's spectral absorbance data of the Earth's atmosphere.

Similar studies have been undertaken in other parts of the world, or repeating Judd et al.s analysis with modern computational methods. In several of these studies, the daylight locus is notably closer to the Planckian locus than in Judd et al.

 Computation
The relative spectral power distribution (SPD)  of a D series illuminant can be derived from its chromaticity coordinates in the CIE 1931 color space, :

where T is the illuminant's CCT. The chromaticity coordinates of the illuminants D are said to form the CIE daylight locus. The relative SPD is given by:

where  are the mean and first two eigenvector SPDs, depicted above.

The CCTs of the canonical illuminants, D50, D55, D65, and D75, differ slightly from what their names suggest. For example, D50 has a CCT of 5003 K ("horizon" light), while D65 has a CCT of 6504 K (noon light). As explained in a previous section, this is because the value of the constants in Planck's law have been slightly changed since the definition of these canonical illuminants, whose SPDs are based on the original values in Planck's law. In order to match all significant digits of the published data of the canonical illuminants the values of M1 and M2 have to be rounded to three decimal places before calculation of SD.

Illuminant E

Illuminant E is an equal-energy radiator; it has a constant SPD inside the visible spectrum. It is useful as a theoretical reference; an illuminant that gives equal weight to all wavelengths. It also has equal CIE XYZ tristimulus values, thus its chromaticity coordinates are (x,y)=(1/3,1/3). This is by design; the XYZ color matching functions are normalized such that their integrals over the visible spectrum are the same.

Illuminant E is not a black body, so it does not have a color temperature, but it can be approximated by a D series illuminant with a CCT of 5455 K. (Of the canonical illuminants, D55 is the closest.) Manufacturers sometimes compare light sources against illuminant E to calculate the excitation purity.

Illuminant series F
The F''' series of illuminants represent various types of fluorescent lighting.

F1–F6 "standard" fluorescent lamps consist of two semi-broadband emissions of antimony and manganese activations in calcium halophosphate phosphor. F4 is of particular interest since it was used for calibrating the CIE color rendering index (the CRI formula was chosen such that F4 would have a CRI of 51). F7–F9 are "broadband" (full-spectrum light) fluorescent lamps with multiple phosphors, and higher CRIs. Finally, F10–F12 are narrow triband illuminants consisting of three "narrowband" emissions (caused by ternary compositions of rare-earth phosphors) in the R,G,B regions of the visible spectrum. The phosphor weights can be tuned to achieve the desired CCT.

Illuminant series LED
Publication 15:2018 introduces new illuminants for different LED types with CCTs ranging from approx. 2700 K to 6600 K.

White point

The spectrum of a standard illuminant, like any other profile of light, can be converted into tristimulus values. The set of three tristimulus coordinates of an illuminant is called a white point''. If the profile is normalized, then the white point can equivalently be expressed as a pair of chromaticity coordinates.

If an image is recorded in tristimulus coordinates (or in values which can be converted to and from them), then the white point of the illuminant used gives the maximum value of the tristimulus coordinates that will be recorded at any point in the image, in the absence of fluorescence. It is called the white point of the image.

The process of calculating the white point discards a great deal of information about the profile of the illuminant, and so although it is true that for every illuminant the exact white point can be calculated, it is not the case that knowing the white point of an image alone tells you a great deal about the illuminant that was used to record it.

White points of standard illuminants

References

External links
 Selected colorimetric tables in Excel, as published in CIE 15:2004
 Konica Minolta Sensing: Light sources & Illuminants

Light
Color